Bomar is a surname. Notable people with the surname include:

 Benjamin Bomar (1816–1868), American politician
 Lynn Bomar (1901–1964), American football player
 Maalik Bomar (born 1990), Canadian football player
 Mary A. Bomar, British-born American government official
 Rhett Bomar (born 1985), American football player
 Scott Bomar (born 1974), American musician
 William Purinton Bomar Jr. (1919–1991), American artist

See also
 Bomar, Alabama, unincorporated community
 Shelbyville Municipal Airport (Tennessee), also known as Bomar Field